Carriage Crossing is an open-air regional lifestyle shopping center in suburban Collierville, Tennessee outside Memphis, Tennessee. The property was originally developed by Cousins Properties as the Avenue Carriage Crossing, opening in 2005.  In 2012, DRA Advisors partnered with PM Lifestyle Centers to purchase the property for $55 million. The anchor stores are Macy's (closing April 2021) and Dillard's.

Anchors
Dillard's
Macy's (originally Parisian, closing 2021)

See also
List of shopping malls in Tennessee

References

External links
Carriage Crossing
Poag & McEwen Lifestyle Centers

Shopping malls in Tennessee
Shopping malls established in 2005
Buildings and structures in Shelby County, Tennessee
Tourist attractions in Shelby County, Tennessee
Collierville, Tennessee